= Laghman airstrikes =

The Laghman airstrikes refers to two separate airstrikes by the United States, with claimed Pakistani support or compliance, (20 April 2007 and 23 January 2009).

== See also ==
- Shrawangai Nazarkhel airstrike
