= Shrawangai Nazarkhel airstrike =

The Shrawangai Nazarkhel airstrike (February 12, 2009) was a military airstrike by the United States against Islamic terrorists in the Waziristan province of Pakistan.

== See also ==
- Laghman airstrikes - January 2009
